The Battle of the Diablo Mountains was an October 1854 engagement between the U.S. Army and the Lipan Apache. A small force of Mounted Rifles attacked a much larger force of Lipan Apaches at the base of the Diablo Mountains in Texas.

Battle
Setting out from Fort Inge in South Texas on October 1, 1854, Captain John G. Walker, in command of around 40 men of the Mounted Rifles, headed for the Diablo Mountains region along the Rio Grande border with Mexico. 

Their mission was to investigate the reports from local settlers of stolen livestock, taken by Apache warriors. On the third day out, in the morning of October 3, 1854, Captain Walker and his men encountered well over 200 Lipan warriors near a herd of captured farm animals. Immediately Walker ordered an attack which surprised the Apaches significantly. A brief skirmish ensued and the Apaches quickly fled, leaving most of the stolen livestock. Casualties are unknown, except for Second Lieutenant Eugene Asa Carr who was wounded by an arrow and subsequently commended by General Persifor F. Smith for his "gallantry and coolness" and promoted to first lieutenant. This was the future general's first combat action.

See also
American Indian Wars
The Diablo Mountains are located at:

References
 Lowe, Richard G.,Walker's Texas Division, C.S.A: Greyhounds of the Trans-Mississippi, Louisiana State University Press, 2004, .
 Eicher, John H., and Eicher, David J., Civil War High Commands, Stanford University Press, 2001, .
 Warner, Ezra J., Generals in Blue: Lives of the Union Commanders, Louisiana State University Press, 1964, .
Texas History site for Carr

 Kaywaykla, James (edited Eve Ball) "In the Days of Victorio: Recollections of a Warm Springs Apache" Tucson: University of Arizona Press 1970
Lavender, David. The Rockies. Revised Edition. N.Y.: Harper & Row, 1975.
Limerick, Patricia Nelson. The Legacy of Conquest: The Unbroken Past of the American West. N.Y.: W.W. Norton, 1987.
Smith, Duane A. Rocky Mountain West: Colorado, Wyoming, & Montana, 1859-1915. Albuquerque: University of New Mexico Press, 1992.

Williams, Albert N. Rocky Mountain Country. N.Y.: Duell, Sloan & Pearce, 1950.

External links
The Davis Mountains of Texas: Sierra Diablo Mountains.

Battles involving the Apache
Battles involving the United States
History of United States expansionism
19th-century military history of the United States
History of Texas
Conflicts in 1854
1854 in Texas
Apache Wars
October 1854 events